A list of American films released in 2002. Chicago won the Academy Award for Best Picture and the Golden Globe Award for Best Motion Picture – Musical or Comedy. The Hours won the Golden Globe Award for Best Motion Picture – Drama. Far from Heaven won the Satellite Award for Best Film – Drama. My Big Fat Greek Wedding won the Satellite Award for Best Film – Musical or Comedy.

Bowling for Columbine won the Academy Award for Best Documentary. The Kid Stays in the Picture won the Satellite Award for Best Documentary Film.

Personal Velocity: Three Portraits won the Grand Jury Prize: Dramatic. Daughter from Danang won the Grand Jury Prize: Documentary.

Swept Away won the Golden Raspberry Award for Worst Picture.

See also
 2002 in American television
 2002 in the United States

External links

 
 List of 2002 box office number-one films in the United States

Lists of 2002 films by country or language
Films
2002